Francisco Gil may refer to:

 Francisco Gil (footballer) (born 2000), Argentine forward for Club Atlético Brown
 Francisco Gil de Taboada (born 1736), Spanish naval officer
 Francisco Gil Díaz (born 1943), Mexican economist
 Francisco Gil Villegas (born 1953), Mexican academic